Halvah ice cream is a Middle Eastern variation of ice cream which is made of sesame Halva, tahini, eggs, cream, and sugar, and usually topped with pistachios and Silan (date syrup). It has been compared to Snickers ice cream.

See also
 List of ice cream flavors

References

Flavors of ice cream
Israeli desserts